Tai Pao, known in Vietnamese sources as Tai Hang Tong (Hàng Tổng), is a Tai language of Vietnam and Laos. In Laos, it is spoken in Khamkeut District, Pakkading District, and Viengthong District of Bolikhamxai Province. Two dialects of Tai Hang Tong are distinguished: Tai Pao and Tai Yo.

Lai Pao script 
The Tai Hang Tong in Mường Khương, Nghệ An Province preserve a unique script called Lai Pao or Lai Paw. Since 2006, the preservation of Lai Pao script was made possible by conservation works of Michel Ferlus.

References

Tai languages
Languages of Vietnam